Rexley Tarivuti (born 1 December 1985, Vanuatu) is a Vanuatuan international footballer who played for Vanuatu national football team as a defender as well as Vanuatuan club Spirit 08 F.C. at club level.

External links

1985 births
Living people
Vanuatuan footballers
Vanuatu international footballers
Association football defenders
Spirit 08 F.C. players